Kathryn Ann Ramel (born 7 September 1973) is a New Zealand former cricketer who played primarily as a right-arm medium bowler. She appeared in 47 One Day Internationals for New Zealand between 1997 and 2002. She played domestic cricket for Auckland. Following her playing career, Ramel became a teacher, and later a principal, at a school in Auckland.

References

External links

1973 births
Living people
Cricketers from Auckland
New Zealand women cricketers
New Zealand women One Day International cricketers
Auckland Hearts cricketers